Vivir es hoy is  a studio album by the Argentine singer Soledad Pastorutti, released by Sony Music on 10 March 2015. The album is a fusion of Latin pop and Latin folk, produced by Gian Marco and Matías Zapata, and recorded in Buenos Aires and Los Angeles.

Background 

It took a little more than two years to create the album, and Soledad has spoken on occasions to the press about the creation of the album.

Taking as a reference the work embodied in Raíz, a collaborative album released the previous year that united her with Lila Downs and Niña Pastori, Soledad confided during an interview with Télam, "I needed people to know where I wanted to go and could go. In Raíz we found this fusion thing that sounds like a hybrid to no one, it's like natural and it's what I expected. So now I decided to move forward with the idea of being able to mix pop with folk music of Argentine and of all of Latin America. With this album I was discovering what things are better. Instead of taking songs from here to there, I looked for songs from everywhere to take them to another place".

In that same Télam interview, speaking about "Aleluya", Soledad said, "Matías told me about this song, I did the translation of the lyrics and we turned it into the style of folk music from the north of Argentina, and only later Matías let me listen to the versions of Cohen and Jeff Buckley that are so moving they make your blood run cold."

Speaking to the press at a reception in a mansion in the Núñez neighborhood, in the north of Buenos Aires, Soledad revealed how she invited Carlos Santana to perform on the album: "What I did was send him an email, telling him a little about the aim of the song because for us the guitar is fundamental and I always had the fantasy that he would record on some album. Maybe it was crazy, but I didn't want to miss the opportunity."

Track listing

Production 
Tracks produced by Gian Marco
 recorded in Enjoy Music Studios, Los Angeles; recording engineer: Gian Marco
 drums, bass, and piano recorded in The Sound Factory, Los Angeles; recording engineer: Adrian Bernabé Trujillo
 accordion in "Dame Una Sonrisa": On The Groove Studio, Miami; recording engineers: Andrés Castro and Luis Barrera
 charangos and quenas: Cabina Libre Studio, Lima, Peru; recording engineer: Alfredo Quequezana
 cello: Xtrings Studio, Miami; recording engineer: Pedro Alfonso
 mixing: David Santos, Digisound Mastering, Los Angeles

Tracks produced by Matías Zapata
 recorded in Estudio Bulo and Cuartito Estudio, Buenos Aires, Argentina
 voices recorded by Daniel Ianniruberto in Estudio El Charquito, Buenos Aires
 horn section recorded in Estudio Sudestadahorns, Buenos Aires
 recording engineers: Nacho De La Riega and Matías Zapata
 mixed in Estudio El Charquito, Buenos Aires, by Daniel Ianniruberto and Matías Zapata
 music production of "Estrella Fugaz":
 Spanish voice direction of Zezé Di Camargo: Lucas Robles
 production assistant: Helio Bernal
 recording technician: Paulo Penov
 editing and tuning: Enrico Nunes
 recorded by Silas Godoy in Mosh Studios, São Paulo

Mastering: Nicolás Kalwill

References

External links 
Soledad official website
Soledad YouTube official channel

Spanish-language albums
2015 albums